Thomas Sutcliffe (born 12 August 1956 in Yorkshire, England) is a British journalist and arts broadcaster. He has presented the BBC Radio 4 arts show Saturday Review since 1999, and until 2022 was chairman of Round Britain Quiz.

Early life and education
Sutcliffe was educated at Lancaster Royal Grammar School and studied English at Emmanuel College, Cambridge.

Career
Sutcliffe joined the BBC when he graduated from university. After editing the BBC Radio 4 arts programme Kaleidoscope, in 1986 he became the first arts editor of The Independent newspaper, a columnist and television reviewer.

Sutcliffe presented the BBC Radio 4 arts show Saturday Review from  1999 until it was scrapped in 2021. He was chairman of Round Britain Quiz until 2022.

Awards
In 1995 Sutcliffe won the Peter Black Award for Broadcast Journalism.

References

1956 births
Living people
Alumni of Emmanuel College, Cambridge
BBC radio presenters
Journalists from Yorkshire
People educated at Lancaster Royal Grammar School